Return to Haifa is a novella written by Palestinian author and journalist, Ghassan Kanafani, which mainly depicts the Palestinian-Israeli conflict during the 1948 war in Haifa when Britain was in control of the land.

The novella is an experience of Kanafani but also illustrates what Palestinians go through. As argued by critics, Kanafani successfully weds literary technique to political practice, as his fictional characters tend to reflect the Palestinian condition.

Characters 

Said S.: Protagonist; a Palestinian who lived with his wife and child in Haifa, until Haifa became a conflict zone between Palestinians and Jews in 1948, making him and his wife flee to Ramallah.

Safiyah:  Said S's wife. They got married 1 year and 4 months before losing Khuldun. She used to live in the countryside before coming to Haifa.

Khalid and Khalida: Despite no appearance in the novel, they are Said S's and Safiyah's children.

Miriam: A Jewish lady who took care of Khuldun (Dov). She came from Bolonia in March 1948 and lived in Saeed S's and Safiyah's house with her husband, Efrat.

Iphrat Koshen: Miriam's husband; he found Khuldun through the Jewish Agency and adopted him.

Khuldun (Dov): Said S's and Safiyah's child whom they lost, eventually became Jewish after living with his foster family, and part of the army.

Plot 
The story starts with Said S. arriving in the city of Haifa after the Mandelbaum Gate opened. It brought an abundant amount of memories and feelings mixed together taking him and his wife, Safiyah, 20 years back, on the 21st of April 1948. It was the day they lost their son, Khuldun, because of war that made situations difficult and horrible for them, causing them to leave forcefully by a British ship that took them to the city of Acre.

The novel narrates that on this date, there was an explosion in Haifa coming from Mount Carmel. Said S felt overwhelmed as he saw everything getting worse, from armies showing up, to more explosions happening, making it hard for him to navigate through. Safiya and he were on two opposite sides; as she rushed through the crowds of people to see him, she realised Khuldun was still sleeping inside their house at Hallisa.

Calling out Khuldun's name numerous times, there was no response. After she saw Said S. from far, they both were on the verge of despair and tears, realising they lost their son. Since then, they tried all means of searching for him, from getting in touch with the Red Crescent, and sending friends to the area to help them look.

Haifa was the core of all these memories for both Said S. and Safiya. “This is Haifa”, as Said S. would say. Driving through, he was contemplating everything, and how the street names “never really tended to change”, still reading their names as King Faisal Street, Wadi NisNas, and so on. They tended to speak about everything, except Khuldun. However, a week before, in the city of Ramallah, Safiyah told Said S. how much she wanted to visit Haifa, “just to see it”, but Said found it useless. But at the same time, he knew what she was up for, as he internally wanted the same, despite telling himself that there was no hope; to see if their son is still alive.

While at Haifa, they visited their old house and contemplated the memories, old objects, and the bell that changed. A Jewish lady, Mariam, was the one there. After the day Said S and Safiyah went with the British ship, their house was given over to Marian and her husband, Iphrat Koshen, and Mariam told them the story of Khuldun, who became Dov, and how they adopted him from the Jewish Agency after a neighbour found him alone.

They stayed at the house late waiting for Dov (Khuldun) to come, as he was supposed to give a decision on who he wanted to be with after Mariam tells him the story. He came home late at night; he was wearing his army suit, and after knowing everything, he didn't have any feelings toward his real parents. He said he is a Jew, and his parents were Jewish, despite knowing that they aren't his real parents; and despite knowing that his parents were Arab, nothing changed for him.

He blamed Safiyah and Said because “they are the ones who left him, and could’ve searched for him instead of crying throughout these 20 years”. Said S, feeling shocked and angry, told Dov that he cannot use what he considers other people's fault to justify his own mistakes, as "two mistakes do not equate to correctness", and said to Mariam that she didn't tell him the truth by only pointing out that “his parents left him and went”, as the situation was horrible that day in order to only summarise it this way.

The story ends as Said realises how much he wanted to leave, that he and Safiyah “never found their son from the first place as this can’t be him”, and how much he owes his son Khalid into letting him go with the Fidayeen, and how much he appreciated him, and that he hopes he went on his own while his parents were away.

Quotes 
“Do you know what the homeland is, Safiyya? The homeland is where none of this can happen”.

The greatest crime any human being can commit, whoever he may be, is to believe even for one moment that the weakness and mistakes of others give him the right to exist at their expense and justify his own mistakes and crimes.

"Maybe your first battle will be with a fida'i named Khalid. Khalid is my son. I beg you to notice that I did not say he's your brother. As you said, man is a cause. Last week Khalid joined the fedayeen. Do you know why we named him Khalid and not Khaldun? Because we always thought we'd find you, even if it took twenty years. But it didn't happen. We didn't find you, and I don't believe we will find you".

Adaptations 
The novella by Ghassan Kanafani was re-created into a number of films and plays, including:

1982 Lebanese film, Return to Haifa, directed by Kassem Hawal. The film revolves around the same questions: who is the real mother? Who is the real father? What is a homeland? And whose is it? What is the way to return to Haifa?

1995 Iranian film, The Survivor, directed by Seifollah Dad. Based upon the script of Return to Haifa, the film talks about the Palestinian case, telling the story of a Palestinian doctor who lives with his wife and Farahan, his son, in Haifa while facing the Israeli occupation.

2004 Syrian TV series, Return to Haifa, produced by Basil al Khatib. (citation). It discusses the Palestinian case from a humanitarian perspective, narrating the story of Palestinians during 1948 war in Haifa, being forced out of their homes, through focusing on the destiny of a Palestinian family.

References

1969 novels
Arabic-language novels
Palestinian novels
Works by Ghassan Kanafani